The Film is a 2005 Indian thriller film directed by Junaid Memon who also produced with Amitabh Bhattacharya. It stars Mahima Chaudhry, Khalid Siddiqui, Ananya Khare, Chahat Khanna, Ravi Gossain, Vaibhav Jhalani and Vivek Madan with Sulabha Deshpande, Mukesh Khanna, Nasser Abdullah and Rakesh Bedi in important supporting roles with a voice-over by Irrfan Khan. The film focuses on seven strugglers who, after failing constantly in their attempts to enter the Bollywood industry, choose the path of crime to achieve this end.

Cast
 Mahima Chaudhry as Sushmita Banerjee
 Khalid Siddiqui as Vijay
 Ananya Khare as Nandini
 Chahat Khanna as Ankita 
 Ravi Gossain as Raman
 Vaibhav Jhalani as Aditya 
 Vivek Madan as Irfan
 Mukesh Khanna as Police Commissioner
 Sulabha Deshpande as Mrs. Briganza
 Nassar Abdullah as Inspector Javed Khan
 Rakesh Bedi as Pappi Da
 Ranvir Shorey as Director Kaushik
 Irrfan Khan as voice-over of Shamim Bhai
 Satyen Kappu as Guruji

Critical reception
IndiaGlitz wrote that film has a message of "shortcuts" and "crime never pays" but with a "predictable script". The critic Taran Adarsh rated the film 1.5 out 5, writing, "THE FILM is a decent attempt by a first-time director, who has focused more on the story than the stars." Indrani Roy Mitra from Rediff praised the film, describing it as "a laudable effort" from Memon.

References

External links
 
 The Film at Bollywood Hungama
 The Film at mm52 portal
 The Film at Rotten Tomatoes
 The Film at Molodezhnaja portal (German)

Indian comedy thriller films
2000s mystery thriller films
Indian crime comedy films
2005 films
Films shot in Mumbai
Indian crime thriller films
Films about filmmaking
Films about actors
2000s Hindi-language films